Himmat may refer to:
Himmat (1996 film)
Himmat (1970 film)
Himmat (1941 film)
Himmat (app), a women's safety mobile application of the Delhi Police
Himmat, an Indian English-language weekly published by Rajmohan Gandhi

See also